Onyeka Ibe (born 29 September 1971) is a Nigerian-born American abstract expressionist painter. He achieved success at the age of 16 when he first exhibited his work at The National Gallery of Modern Art, Lagos. Described as one of the most exciting young painters to emerge from Sub-Saharan Africa since the 1990s, he was awarded "The Best SOLO Artist of the Year 2006" at the International Artexpo New York. In July 2007, Art Business News profiled and named him as one of "Today’s Top Artist". Ibe obtained a Bachelor of Fine Arts from the University of Benin, Nigeria.

Personal life
Ibe was born on 29 September 1971. He was born not long after the end of the Nigerian civil war and grew up in a developing democracy that was abruptly terminated. He has described his father as a major influence, who encouraged him to pursue fine arts from a young age. His art style and techniques were influenced by the work of Pablo Picasso and Jackson Pollock.

References

External links

|https://twitter.com/onyekaibe

Living people
1971 births
Abstract expressionist artists
American artists
Nigerian contemporary artists
American contemporary artists
American people of Nigerian descent